Vicki Sparks is a British sports journalist and football commentator for BBC Sport and BT Sport. She has reported for Final Score and BBC Radio 5 Live. She also regularly covers women's football for the BBC.

In March 2017, after a post-match interview, Sunderland manager David Moyes took issue at one of Sparks' questions to him and said “You were just getting a wee bit naughty at the end there, so just watch yourself. You still might get a slap even though you’re a woman. Careful the next time you come in.” In June, The Football Association fined him £30,000 for "improper and threatening remarks".

Sparks was part of the BBC's team covering the 2018 FIFA World Cup in Russia. On 20 June of that year, she became the first woman to commentate on a live World Cup match on British television, BBC One's coverage of Portugal's 1–0 victory over Morocco in Group B in Saransk. Sparks and female pundits Eniola Aluko and Alex Scott were subjected to online criticism, and former player Jason Cundy said her voice was too high-pitched for commentary, while other figures such as Jacqui Oatley and Piers Morgan praised them and said that the criticism was due to sexism.
Sparks has also guested on the BBC show Fighting Talk.

References

Living people
BBC sports presenters and reporters
English association football commentators
People from Newcastle upon Tyne
Year of birth missing (living people)